Marsenina is a genus of small slug-like sea snails, marine gastropod molluscs in the subfamily Velutininae within the family Velutinidae.

Species
Species within the genus Marsenina include: 

 Marsenina ampla Verrill, 1880
 Marsenina glabra (Couthouy, 1838) - bald lamellaria
 Marsenina globosa L. M. Perry, 1939
 Marsenina rhombica (Dall, 1871)
 Marsenina stearnsii (Dall, 1871)
 Marsenina uchidai (''Habe, 1958)
 Marsenina zadei Behrens, Ornelas & Valdés, 2014Taxon inquirendum Marsenina liouvillei Vayssière, 1917
Species brought into synonymy
 Marsenina micromphala Bergh, 1853: synonym of Marsenina glabra (Couthouy, 1838)
 Marsenina prodita Lovén, 1846: synonym of * Marsenina glabra'' (Couthouy, 1838)

References 

 Nomenclator Zoologicus info
 ITIS info with species list

Velutinidae
Taxa named by John Edward Gray